The 1981 CFL Draft composed of seven rounds where 81 Canadian football players were chosen from eligible Canadian universities and Canadian players playing in the NCAA. A total of 18 players were selected as territorial exemptions, with every team making at least one selection during this stage of the draft. Through a trade with the Saskatchewan Roughriders, the Calgary Stampeders selected first overall in the draft.

Territorial exemptions

Saskatchewan Roughriders                                Eugene Larocque  DT  Utah

Toronto Argonauts                                       Hazen Carinci  DB  Simon Fraser

Toronto Argonauts                                           Dan Ferrone             G                Simon Fraser

Toronto Argonauts                                           Bernie Pickett  TB  Wilfrid Laurier

Toronto Argonauts                                           Bob Bronk  TB  Queen's

Ottawa Rough Riders  John Park  TE  Bowling Green

Ottawa Rough Riders                                         Ian Beckstead  TE  Richmond

Montreal Alouettes                                      Marc Lacelle  TB  McGill

British Columbia Lions  Rob Smith  G  Utah State

British Columbia Lions                                      Rick Klassen            G                 Simon Fraser

Calgary Stampeders                                      Scott MacArthur  DE  Calgary

Calgary Stampeders                                          Shawn Beaton  DL  Boise State

Calgary Stampeders                                          Randy Besler  G  Northeast Missouri

Calgary Stampeders                                          Randy Fournier  DT  Cincinnati

Winnipeg Blue Bombers                                   Perry Kuras  G  North Dakota

Hamilton Tiger-Cats                                     Bill Howard  C  Western Ontario

Edmonton Eskimos                                        Sean Kehoe  TB  Alberta

Edmonton Eskimos                                            Joshua Borger  WR  Calgary

1st round

2nd round
10. Saskatchewan Roughriders                                Hazen Henderson         DB              Simon Fraser

11. Toronto Argonauts                                       Gord Elser              LB              Calgary

12. Ottawa Rough Riders                                     Don Burns  WR  Ottawa

13. Montreal Alouettes  Samuel Marshall         DB              Simon Fraser

14. Toronto Argonauts                                       Warner Miles            OL              Ottawa

15. Montreal Alouettes                                      Fred Prinzen  LB  Queen's

16. Winnipeg Blue Bombers  Dave Brown              WR              Alberta

17. Calgary Stampeders                                      Terry Lehne  DB  Saskatchewan

18. Edmonton Eskimos  Mike Reid               C               Ottawa

3rd round
19. Saskatchewan Roughriders                                Don Busto              FL/DB            Simon Fraser

20. Toronto Argonauts                                       Don Dominico           WR               Western Ontario

21. British Columbia Lions                                  Jamie Armstead         DB               Calgary

22. Montreal Alouettes                                      Joe Kuklo              DB               Simon Fraser

23. British Columbia Lions                                  Larry Priestnall  TB  Acadia

24. Calgary Stampeders                                      Kari Suutari           LB               Wisconsin

25. Winnipeg Blue Bombers                                   Hubert Walsh           TB               Acadia

26. Hamilton Tiger-Cats                                     Jeff Arp               G                Western Ontario

27. Edmonton Eskimos                                        Scott Essery  TE  Windsor

4th round
28. Saskatchewan Roughriders  David Pearson          DT               Western Ontario

29. Ottawa Rough Riders  John Lowe  TB  Guelph

30. Ottawa Rough Riders                                     Eric Boss              DT               Toronto

31. Montreal Alouettes                                      Dean Claridge  DE  British Columbia

32. British Columbia Lions  Ed Jones               DB               Simon Fraser

33. Calgary Stampeders                                      Ted Kozik  DE  Saint Mary's

34. Winnipeg Blue Bombers                                   Dick Rigelhof          LB               North Dakota

35. Hamilton Tiger-Cats                                     Rob Sommerville        DB               Waterloo

36. Edmonton Eskimos                                        Ron Lammer             DL               Alberta

5th round

6th round
46. Saskatchewan Roughriders                                John Celestino         DT               Windsor

47. Toronto Argonauts                                       Jeff Hale              T                Guelph

48. Ottawa Rough Riders                                     Anthony Refosso        T                Toronto

49. Montreal Alouettes                                      Dominic Vetro         WR                Wilfrid Laurier

50. British Columbia Lions                                  David Thornhill       WR                Bishop's

51. Calgary Stampeders                                      Jay Triano           DB                Simon Fraser

52. Winnipeg Blue Bombers                                   Hugh Goodman          DL                Acadia

53. Hamilton Tiger-Cats                                     Ian Troop             G                 Wilfrid Laurier

54. Edmonton Eskimos                                        Wyatt Wishart        DT                Concordia

7th round
55. Saskatchewan Roughriders                                Wayne Stremel        LB                Simon Fraser

56. Toronto Argonauts  Kevin Malone          DB                Queen's

57. Ottawa Rough Riders                                     Rob Ball              DB                Queen's

58. Montreal Alouettes                                      Dave Ridgway  K  Toledo

59. British Columbia Lions                                  Ed Hole               T                 Alberta

60. Calgary Stampeders  Wayne Harris          LB                Calgary

61. Winnipeg Blue Bombers                                   Peter Martell  TB  St. Francis Xavier

62. Hamilton Tiger-Cats  Bill Paul  TB  Sheridan

63. Edmonton Eskimos                                        Craig Mallender       TB                Windsor

References
Canadian Draft

Canadian College Draft
Cfl Draft, 1981